The 1961–62 season was Mansfield Town's 24th season in the Football League and 2nd in the Fourth Division, they finished in 14th position with 44 points.

Final league table

Results

Football League Fourth Division

FA Cup

League Cup

Squad statistics
 Squad list sourced from

References
General
 Mansfield Town 1961–62 at soccerbase.com (use drop down list to select relevant season)

Specific

Mansfield Town F.C. seasons
Mansfield Town